

Players

First team squad
As of February 16, 2011

League table

Competitions

League

FA Cup

League Cup

References

Buriram F.C.